The 2012–13 West Coast Conference women's basketball season began with practices in October 2012 and ended with the 2013 West Coast Conference women's basketball tournament at the Orleans Arena March 6–11, 2013 in Las Vegas. The regular season began in November, with the conference schedule starting at the end of December. 

This season was the 28th for WCC women's basketball, which began in the 1985–86 season when the league was known as the West Coast Athletic Conference (WCAC). It was also the 23rd season under the West Coast Conference name (the conference began as the California Basketball Association in 1952, became the WCAC in 1956, and dropped the word "Athletic" in 1989). After having no changes from 1980 until 2011, the conference will have its second change in three years in 2013. Original conference founder, and a fellow faith-based, private school Pacific will rejoin the conference.  Pacific will come from the Big West.

Pre-season
 Pre-season media day took place at the same time the men's media day did. However the women's media day was toned down quite a bit. No interviews or TV announcements took place. Instead they only announced the pre-season picks and pre-season teams.

2012–13 West Coast Women's Basketball Media Poll
Rank, School (first-place votes), Points
1. BYU (5), 61
2. Gonzaga (4), 60
3. Saint Mary's, 48
4. San Diego, 36
5. Pepperdine, 33
6. Santa Clara, 27
7. Loyola Marymount, 25
8. Portland, 24
9. San Francisco, 10

2012–13 West Coast Women's Preseason All-West Conference Team
Player, School, Yr., Pos.
Alex Cowling, Loyola Marymount, RS-Sr., G/F
Lexi Eaton, BYU, So., G
Megan Fulps, Santa Clara, Sr., G
Jennifer Hamson, BYU, Jr., C
Amy Kame, San Diego, Jr., G
Taelor Karr, Gonzaga, Sr., G
Danielle Mauldin, Saint Mary's, Jr., F
Jackie Nared, Saint Mary's, Jr., G
Haiden Palmer, Gonzaga, Jr., G
Haley Steed, BYU, Sr., G

Rankings

Non-Conference games

Conference games

Composite Matrix
This table summarizes the head-to-head results between teams in conference play. (x) indicates games remaining this season.

Conference tournament

  March 6–11, 2013– West Coast Conference Basketball Tournament, Orleans Arena, Las Vegas, NV.

Head coaches
Jeff Judkins, BYU
Kelly Graves, Gonzaga
Charity Elliott, Loyola Marymount
Julie Rousseau, Pepperdine
Jim Sollars, Portland
Paul Thomas, Saint Mary's
Cindy Fisher, San Diego
Jennifer Azzi, San Francisco
Jennifer Mountain, Santa Clara

Post season

NCAA tournament

WNIT

WBI

No WCC teams participated in the 2013 WBI.

Highlights and notes

Awards and honors

Scholar-Athlete of the Year

WCC Player-of-the-Week

 Nov. 12 – Danielle Mauldin, F, St. Mary's
 Nov. 26 – Jackie Nared, G, Saint Mary's
 Dec. 10 – Haley Steed, G, BYU
 Dec. 24 – Kari Luttinen, G, Portland
 Jan. 7  – Taelor Karr, G, Gonzaga
 Jan. 21 – Haiden Palmer, G, Gonzaga
 Feb. 4 – Haiden Palmer, G, Gonzaga
 Feb. 18 – Mary Hood, F, San Diego
 Mar. 4 - 
 Nov. 19 – Hazel Ramirez, G, Loyola Marymount
 Dec. 3 – Amy Kame, G, San Diego
 Dec. 17 – Kari Luttinen, G, Portland
 Dec. 31  – Jackie Nared, G, Saint Mary's
 Jan. 14 – Jackie Nared, G, Saint Mary's
 Jan. 28 – Klara Wischer, F, San Diego
 Feb. 11 – Annika Holopainen, F, Portland
 Feb. 25 – Jennifer Hamson, F, BYU

College Sports Madnesss West Coast Player of the Week

 Nov. 12 – Keani Albanez, G, Gonzaga
 Nov. 26 – Jackie Nared, G, Saint Mary's
 Dec. 10 – Haley Steed, G, BYU (Also ESPNW Player of the week)
 Dec. 24 – Haley Steed, G, BYU
 Jan. 7  – Shannon Mauldin, F, Saint Mary's
 Jan. 21 – Haiden Palmer, G, Gonzaga
 Feb. 4 – Haley Steed, G, BYU
 Feb. 18 – Maya Hood, F, San Diego
 Mar. 4 - 
 Nov. 19 – Alex Cowling, G/F, Loyola Marymount
 Dec. 3 – Amy Kame, G, San Diego
 Dec. 17 – Kari Luttinen, G, Portland
 Dec. 31  – Jackie Nared, G, Saint Mary's
 Jan. 14 – Lindsay Leo, F, Santa Clara
 Jan. 28 – Klara Wischer, F, San Diego
 Feb. 11 – Jackie Nared, G, Saint Mary's
 Feb. 25 – Katelyn McDaniel, F, San Diego

Player-of-the-Month
 November – Amy Kame, G, San Diego
 December – Mel Khlok, G, San Francisco
 January – Taelor Karr, G, Gonzaga
 February –

All-Americans

All West Coast Conference teams
Voting was by conference coaches:
Player of The Year:
Newcomer of The Year:
Defensive Player of The Year:
Coach of The Year:

All conference

Honorable mention

All-Freshman

All-Academic

See also
2012–13 NCAA Division I women's basketball season
West Coast Conference women's basketball tournament
2012–13 West Coast Conference men's basketball season
West Coast Conference men's basketball tournament
2013 West Coast Conference men's basketball tournament

References